The 2011 Tour de Luxembourg cycling race  was the 71st running of the Tour de Luxembourg. It was won by Linus Gerdemann from Germany, a member of the Luxembourg-based team, . Gerdemann became in doing so the first German to ever win the Tour de Luxembourg.

Stages
Key: 
: Leader and eventual winner of General Classification, based on total time.
: Leader and eventual winner of points classification, based on points given for finishing position on each mass start stage.
: Leader and eventual winner of climbers' classification, based on points gained on passing hilltops.
: Leader and eventual winner of young riders' classification, based on total time, but restricted to riders under 25 at beginning of year.

Prologue
1 June 2011 — Luxembourg,  (ITT)

Stage 1
2 June 2011 – Luxembourg to Bascharage,

Stage 2
3 June 2011 – Schifflange to Differdange,

Stage 3
4 June 2011 – Eschweiler to Roost (Luxlait),

Stage 4
5 June 2011 – Mersch to Luxembourg,

Classification leadership

Final standings

General classification

Points classification

Mountains classification

Young riders classification

Team classification

References
General

Specific

Tour de Luxembourg
Tour de Luxembourg
Tour de Luxembourg